The 4th convocation of the People's Assembly of Abkhazia was in place from 2007 until 2012.

Speaker and Vice Speakers

The first session of the 4th convocation of the People's Assembly was held on 3 April 2007. It was opened by the oldest deputy, Vladimir Nachach and attended by President Sergei Bagapsh, Vice President Raul Khajimba, Prime Minister Alexander Ankvab, Supreme Court Head Rauf Korua, Arbitration Court Head A. Gurjua, the deputies of the previous convocation, the members of the Cabinet and regional Administration Heads.

During the first session, Nugzar Ashuba was re-elected to the position of speaker with 26 votes. He had been nominated by Vladimir Nachach, he defeated Adgur Kharazia who had been nominated by Rita Lolua.

The number of Vice Speakers was expanded from two to three. For the first position, Nugzar Ashuba nominated Viacheslav Tsugba for re-election, and Batal Kobakhia Irina Agrba, arguing that it was time for a woman to be elected. Parliament then accepted a legislative amendment proposed by President Bagapsh allowing for a total number of three Vice Speakers, so that both could be elected. For the third position, Albert Ovsepyan was nominated for re-election by Valeri Kondakov, while opposition member Adgur Kharazia nominated Sergei Matosyan. After a heated debate and President Bagapsh expressing his support for Ovsepyan, the latter was re-elected with 19 votes.

On 3 May 2010, Albert Ovsepyan retired as Vice Speaker on account of old age. On 24 September, Sergei Matosyan was elected Vice Speaker in his stead.

Changes in composition

On 10 June 2008 deputy Omar Kvarchia suddenly died. The resulting by-election was won by Emma Gamsonia. On 1 November 2010 Yuri Kereselidze died, on 9 January 2011 Ruslan Kishmaria was elected his successor.

On 8 February, Vladimir Nachach died after a long illness. On 9 March the Central Election Commission decided that the by-election to elect Nachach's successor would be held on 30 April, that formations who wished to nominate a candidate had to register between 11 and 31 March, and that candidates could be nominated between 31 March and 20 April. Three candidates were nominated, all three by initiative groups: Kherson Dashelia, Zaur Avidzba and Said Argun. The by-election was won by Zaur Avidzba with 1028 votes, Said Argun came second with 753 votes and Kherson Dashelia third with 166 votes.

On 9 November 2011, Beslan Jopua's term as MP was terminated due to his appointment as Minister for Agriculture on 18 October by newly elected President Alexander Ankvab.

List of Members

References

 
2007 establishments in Abkhazia
2012 disestablishments in Abkhazia